Vashti Murphy McKenzie (born May 28, 1947) is the interim president and general secretary of the National Council of Churches of Christ in the USA. She's also a retired bishop of the African Methodist Episcopal Church, and author of six books. In 2000, McKenzie became the first woman to be elected as bishop in the denomination's history. She later served as President of the Council of Bishops, becoming the first woman to serve as Titular head of the AME Church.

Early life and education 
Vashti was born on May 28, 1947, in Baltimore, Maryland. She is the daughter of Samuel Edward Smith and Ida Murphy Smith Peters.  She was named after her maternal grandmother, Vashti Turley Murphy, who was one of 22 women who founded the Delta Sigma Theta sorority in 1913, while a student at Howard University.

McKenzie's maternal grandfather, Carl J. Murphy, was the publisher and chief editor of the Baltimore Afro-American, a black newspaper started by his father, John H. Murphy, Sr.  The newspaper was a family enterprise, and Murphy's five daughters were involved as publishers, editors, journalists, and board members. McKenzie began writing for publication at an early age; she recalls that her first journalism opportunity was writing obituaries at age 16.

McKenzie attended high school at Eastern High School, an all-female public high school in Baltimore City.  She was one of only six black students in the school, which had been desegregated in the wake of the Brown vs. Board of Education decision in 1954. McKenzie graduated from Eastern High in 1965.

Following her graduation from high school, McKenzie studied at the Blair School of Journalism for one summer, before matriculating at Morgan State University, where she studied history.  In her junior year, she left school to marry Stan McKenzie, who was playing for the Baltimore Bullets in the NBA.  They couple moved to Arizona when Stan McKenzie was traded to the Phoenix Suns. Later, the McKenzies moved back to Baltimore. Vashti McKenzie went back to school, and earned a Bachelor of Arts in journalism at the University of Maryland.

Career 
After graduating with her degree, McKenzie pursued journalism as a career. She worked at WYCB Radio, and was host of an R&B show.  She later was promoted to Station Manager, which was a position few women held at the time. She continued in broadcasting for several years. She also wrote a column for the Afro-American, entitled "The McKenzie Report."

However, she felt a calling to the ministry, and began studies at Howard University School of Divinity where she obtained a Masters of Divinity. She was ordained as an itinerant deacon in 1981, and ordained as a full minister in 1984.  She later completed a Doctorate in Ministry from United Theological Seminary in Ohio.

McKenzie's first pastorate was at the Oak Street AME church in Baltimore.  In 1990, she became the first woman to serve as the pastor at Payne Memorial AME Church in Baltimore, Maryland.  During the ten years she served in this role, she helped grow the church, and also expand its ministry in the community.  In 1996, she offered the closing prayer on the first night of the Democratic National Convention.  In 1998, Ebony named McKenzie as one of the "15 Greatest Black Woman Preachers" in the US. She tied for first in the balloting, along with Rev. Prathia Hall and Rev. Carolyn Knight.

In 2000, McKenzie made the decision to run for election to the position of bishop in her denomination. As a first time candidate, McKenzie had to explain to church leaders and members why she was qualified to be the first woman bishop.  In an interview for a Christian Post article in 2019, she noted that running for bishop meant '"[h]elping people to take a look at your ministerial track record in your pastorate. The kinds of things that you have done,' she explained. 'Being able to get that message out, being able to show people that it’s not just me being female, that I have had experiences, I'm qualified, and take a look at how God has blessed our ministry as an indication of what we can do in the future.'”

There were 42 candidates for bishop in the election, two of whom were women.  In addition to McKenzie, Rev. Carolyn Tyler Guidry, the first woman to serve as Presiding elder in the AME, also ran for election. (Guidry was later elected as bishop in 2004.)   McKenzie received the second highest number of votes when the General Council of the AME Church voted in July at the national convention in Cincinnati.   In her acceptance speech, she is quoted as saying, "Because of God’s favor, the stained-glass ceiling has been pierced and broken.”  She was consecrated as the 117th bishop in the AME Church, and became the first woman to be elevated to the episcopate.

In her first post as bishop, she was named to the 18th district, which has oversight for AME churches in Africa, mainly in Botswana, Lesotho, Mozambique and Swaziland. She later served as presiding prelate for the Thirteenth District AME, which covers Tennessee and Kentucky. While serving in this role, she was invited by President Barack Obama to join the inaugural President's Advisory Council of the White House Faith-Based and Neighborhood Partnerships.  In 2012, she moved to the Tenth Episcopal District in Texas, where she still presides.

In 2005, she became the titular head of the AME Church, again making history, this time as the first woman to lead the denomination. She was the host Bishop  to the 2016 AME General Conference.

She has written several books on leadership for women in ministry, including Not Without A Struggle, and Strength in the Struggle. She is also the national chaplain of Delta Sigma Theta sorority, Incorporated.

In 2014, she was listed as one of 50 "Powerful Women Religious Figures Around The World" by the Huffington Post.

McKenzie was among a number of African American women from around the United States who endorsed Hillary Rodham Clinton for President in 2016.

Personal life 
Vashti Murphy McKenzie and her husband have three children:  Jon-Mikael McKenzie, Vashti-Jasmine Saint-Jean, and Joi-Marie McKenzie Lewis. She also has three grandchildren and a granddog.

Works 

 Not Without a Struggle: Leadership Development for African American Women in Ministry (1996)  
 Strength in the Struggle: Leadership Development for Women (2001)  
 Swapping Housewives: Rachel and Jacob and Leah (2007) 
Journey to the Well : Twelve Lessons on Personal Transformation (2010)  
 Not Without a Struggle: Leadership Development for African American Women in Ministry (revised and updated edition 2011) 
 The Big Deal of Taking Small Steps to Move Closer to God (2017) 

As editor:

 Those Sisters Can Preach!: 22 Pearls of Wisdom, Virtue and Hope. (2013)

See also 

 African Methodist Episcopal Church
Mary G. Evans
 Martha Jayne Keys
 Amanda Smith

References

External links

1947 births
Living people
Delta Sigma Theta members
African Methodist Episcopal bishops
Women Methodist bishops
Murphy family